Crosseola bellula is a species of small sea snail or micromollusc, a marine gastropod mollusc in the family Conradiidae.

Description
The height of the shell attains 2 mm. The white shell has a depressed turbinate shape. The whorls contain spiral lirae and lack varices. The interstices are neatly cancellated. The simple outer lip is thin and has an acute margin.

Distribution
This marine species occurs off the Philippines and Japan.

References

Sources
 Higo, S., Callomon, P. & Goto, Y. (1999) Catalogue and Bibliography of the Marine Shell-Bearing Mollusca of Japan. Elle Scientific Publications, Yao, Japan, 749 pp
 Rubio F. & Rolán E. (2017). New species of Crosseolidae Hickman, 2013 (Gastropoda) from the Tropical Indo-Pacific. Novapex. 18(1-2): 17-34
 Rubio F. & Rolán E. (2019). New species of Conradiidae Golikov & Starobogatov, 1987 (= Crosseolidae Hickman, 2013) (Gastropoda: Trochoidea) from the Tropical Indo-Pacific II. The genus Crosseola and the description of Crossolida n. gen. Novapex. 20(3): 49–91.

External links
 To World Register of Marine Species
 Adams A. (1865). On some new genera of Mollusca from the seas of Japan. Annals and Magazine of Natural History. ser. 3, 15: 322-324

bellula
Gastropods described in 1865